The women's basketball tournament at the 2019 Southeast Asian Games was held at the Mall of Asia Arena in Pasay, Metro Manila, Philippines from 4 to 10 December.

Competition schedule
The following was the competition schedule for the women's basketball competitions:

Participating nations

Venue
The regular 5-on-5 basketball tournament was held at the Mall of Asia Arena in Pasay.

Cuneta Astrodome was also previously considered as a potential venue for 5-on-5 basketball while the SM Mall of Asia Activity Center was considered to host the 3x3 basketball competitions.

Results

Round robin

All times are Philippine Standard Time (UTC+8)

Final standings

See also
Men's tournament

References

External links
  

Women